Grandison is both a given name and a surname.

As a given name
 Grandison Fairchild (1792–1890), American reformer
 Grandison Delaney Royston (1809–1889), American politician
 Charles Grandison Finney (1792–1875), American Christian minister
 Felton Grandison Clark (1903-1970), African-American university president

As a surname
 Anthony Grandison (born 1953), American drug dealer
 Jacob Grandison (born 1998), American basketball player
 Jermaine Grandison (born 1990), English footballer who plays for Shrewsbury Town F.C.
 Ronnie Grandison (born 1964), American basketball player

Fictional characters
 Sir Charles Grandison, title character of a 1753 novel by Samuel Richardson
 Grandison, title character of a 1899 short story by Charles W. Chesnutt

See also
 Baron Grandison, extinct barony
 Viscount Grandison, Irish viscountcy